Kidepo Airport  is an airfield in Northern Region, Uganda.

Kidepo Airport is one of twelve upcountry airports that are administered by the Uganda Civil Aviation Authority, and one of the five upcountry airports that are authorized to handle cross-border air traffic from member countries of the East African Community, in an effort to promote tourism in Eastern Africa. The other airports with similar authorization are Arua Airport, Gulu Airport, Kasese Airport, and Kisoro Airport. Kidepo Airport receives daily flights from Entebbe International Airport and Murchison Falls National Park, which are primarily used by tourists to visit Kidepo Valley National Park.

Facilities

Airlines and destinations

See also
 Kidepo Valley National Park
 Civil Aviation Authority of Uganda
 List of airports in Uganda
 East African Community

References

External links
 Uganda Civil Aviation Authority Homepage
 

Airports in Uganda
Kaabong District